Douglas Morlan Blubaugh (December 31, 1934 – May 16, 2011) was an American wrestler and Olympic Champion. He competed at the 1960 Olympic Games in Rome, where he became the freestyle Olympic Gold Medalist at welterweight, defeating the legendary 1956 Olympic Champion and 3-time World Champion Iranian Wrestler Emam-Ali Habibi.

Blubaugh, born in Ponca City, Oklahoma, was an AAU Champion and an NCAA Champion in 1957 at Oklahoma State University. In 1959 he won another AAU Championship, winning the Outstanding Wrestler Award. Also in 1959 Blubaugh won a Pan-American Games Gold Medal before he made the 1960 Olympic team. While a student at OSU, Blubaugh was initiated as a member of Tau Kappa Epsilon fraternity; in January 2011, he was inducted into the  Oklahoma Hall of Fame. In 1979, Blubaugh was inducted into the National Wrestling Hall of Fame as a Distinguished Member.

For his efforts in Rome, Blubaugh was named the World's Outstanding Wrestler in 1960. Blubaugh later became wrestling coach at Indiana University.

He resided in Tonkawa, Oklahoma, until his death in a traffic accident while riding his motorcycle. He was struck by a pickup truck, which ran a stop sign.

Blubaugh continued to be an ambassador for the sport of wrestling until his death on May 16, 2011 at the age of 76.

References

External links
 

1934 births
2011 deaths
Wrestlers at the 1960 Summer Olympics
American male sport wrestlers
Olympic gold medalists for the United States in wrestling
People from Ponca City, Oklahoma
Sportspeople from Oklahoma
Oklahoma State Cowboys wrestlers
Indiana University faculty
Road incident deaths in Oklahoma
Motorcycle road incident deaths
People from Tonkawa, Oklahoma
Medalists at the 1960 Summer Olympics
Pan American Games gold medalists for the United States
Pan American Games medalists in wrestling
Wrestlers at the 1959 Pan American Games
Ponca City High School alumni
Medalists at the 1959 Pan American Games